Jan Kasl (born 31 December 1951) is a Czech politician and former Mayor of the City of Prague and one of the leaders of the SNK European Democrats.

Biography 
Kasl was born in 1951 in Prague. He studied architecture at the Czech Technical University in Prague from 1970 to 1976. After graduation he worked as an architect for a cooperative housing enterprise. After the Velvet revolution he founded his own architectural company, that he left after he became mayor of Prague in 1998.

He is married for the second time with journalist Terezie Jungrová, his former media consultant and granddaughter of Ferdinand Peroutka. He has three daughters from his first marriage and two grandchildren.

Kasl is a Member of the Prague Society for International Cooperation, a respected NGO that stemmed from the Underground movement fighting Communism. The Society continues to fight corruption and help to forge a new generation of leaders in Central Europe. The Prague Society is a partner of the Global Panel Foundation.

Political career 

After the Velvet Revolution he entered local politics in Prague. He was elected in 1990 into the city council for Civic Forum. After the break-up of Civic Forum he became a member of the Civic Democratic Party. At the end of its term in the city council he left politics. He returned to politics in 1998, when he became the mayor of Prague. In 2002 he resigned and left the Civic Democratic Party a few weeks before the parliamentary elections, because he thought that party was not able to deal with corruption. A few months later he founded the European Democrats party (also called Democrats of Jan Kasl), now merged into the SNK European Democrats. Two months after the 2006 parliamentary elections (in which party won 2.1% of the vote but no seats) he decided to leave or at least take a break in his political career.

Involvement outside politics 
Kasl is a member of Prague Society for International Cooperation, a respected NGO whose main goals are networking and the development of a new generation of responsible, well-informed leaders and thinkers.

References

External links 
Už se skoro mohlo kopat, řekl k blobu jeho zastánce Jan Kasl (iDnes) 
Jan Kasl (Czech Television) 

1951 births
Living people
Politicians from Prague
Mayors of Prague
SNK European Democrats politicians
Civic Democratic Party (Czech Republic) mayors
Czech Technical University in Prague alumni